is a Japanese "yurukyara" mascot character representing Shimane Prefecture.

See also
 Hikonyan, the mascot for Hikone

Advertising characters
Cat mascots
Fictional cats
Shimane Prefecture
Japanese mascots